Augustus Franklin Ketchum (March 21, 1897 – September 6, 1980) was an American professional baseball pitcher who played in six games for the 1922 Philadelphia Athletics of Major League Baseball (MLB).

Biography
Ketchum played in minor league baseball from 1922 to 1930, except for 1928. In 180 minor league pitching appearances, he accrued a 41–56 win–loss record.

In August and September 1922, Ketchum pitched in six games for the Philadelphia Athletics, the only major league appearances of his career. The Athletics had purchased his contract from the minor league Ardmore Producers for $1750 on July 11. In six relief appearances totaling 16 innings, he compiled an 0–1 record with a 5.62 earned run average while striking out four batters. His loss came on August 11 in a road game against the New York Yankees at the Polo Grounds; entering a 2–2 tie game, Ketchum pitched a scoreless eighth inning, then allowed a run in the ninth on two walks, a sacrifice bunt, and a game-winning single by opposing pitcher Bullet Joe Bush.

Born in 1897 in Royse City, Texas, Ketchum died in 1980 in Oklahoma City, Oklahoma, and was interred in Altus, Oklahoma.

Notes

References

External links

1897 births
1980 deaths
Baseball players from Texas
People from Royse City, Texas
Major League Baseball pitchers
Philadelphia Athletics players
Ardmore Producers players
Shreveport Gassers players
Meridian Metropolitans players
Mexia Gushers players
St. Paul Saints players
Marshall Indians players
Toledo Mud Hens players
Nashville Vols players
Corsicana Oilers players
Monroe Drillers players
Peoria Tractors players
Beaumont Exporters players
Tampa Smokers players
Shreveport Sports players